Akhurian Reservoir is a reservoir on the Akhurian River between Armenia and Turkey. The reservoir has a surface area of 54 km² and a volume of 525 million cubic meters. It is one of the largest reservoirs in the Caucasus, smaller than the Mingachevir reservoir and the Shamkir reservoir in Azerbaijan.

Its water is used for irrigation in Armenia's Aragatsotn, Armavir and Shirak provinces.
Water used on Turkey for irrigation (70000 ha agricultural area) in provinces of Kars and Ardahan.

Foundation 
On April 25, 1963, Turkey and the Soviet Union (which Armenia was part of at the time) signed an agreement on constructing a dam on Akhurian River and regulating the flow of four rivers into the reservoir. It was built between 1975 and 1980 and began to be operated in 1980.

Pollution 
According to Armenian researchers, "the water system is polluted with heavy metals and different toxic materials."

References

External links 

Lakes of Armenia
Reservoirs in Turkey
Landforms of Kars Province
Geography of Shirak Province
Kars Central District
Akyaka District
International lakes of Asia
Armenia–Turkey border